The Chabahar dwarf gecko (Microgecko chabaharensis) is a species of lizard in the family Gekkonidae. It is endemic to southeastern Iran.

References

Microgecko
Reptiles described in 2015
Reptiles of Iran